Council Hill may refer to the following places in the United States:

Council Hill, Illinois
Council Hill, Oklahoma